Early parliamentary elections were held in Albania on 29 June 1997 alongside a simultaneous referendum on restoring the monarchy, with a second round of voting for 32 seats on 6 July. The elections were called as a response to the Albanian Civil War. The result was an overwhelming victory for the opposition Socialist Party of Albania, which won 100 of the 151 seats. Voter turnout was 72.6%.

Results

References

Albanian Civil War
Parliamentary elections in Albania
Albania
1997 in Albania
June 1997 events in Europe
Election and referendum articles with incomplete results